Émile Pouvillon (1840 in Montauban1906 in Chambéry) was a French novelist.

He published a collection of stories entitled Nouvelles réalistes in 1878. Making himself the chronicler of his native province of Quercy in southwestern France, he described its scenery and its life. His rustic novels were in the same vein as those of Jean de Noarrieu and André Theuriet. His L'Innocent (1884) was dedicated to his friend Pierre Loti (the pseudonym of the French naval lieutenant Julien Viaud), later author of Madame Chrysanthème (1887).

Works
His books include:
Césette (1881), the story of a peasant girl
L'Innocent (1884)
Jean-de-Jeanne (1886)
Le Cheval bleu (1888)
Le Vœu d'être chaste (1900)
Chante-pleure (1890)
Les Antibel (1892)
Petites âmes (1893)
Mademoiselle Clémence (1896)
Pays et paysages (1895)
Petites gens (1905)
Bernadette de Lourdes (1894), a mystery
Le Roi de Rome (1898), a play

References

External links
 

1840 births
1906 deaths
People from Montauban
19th-century French novelists
20th-century French novelists
French male novelists
19th-century French male writers
20th-century French male writers